Doug Doull (born May 31, 1974) is a Canadian former professional ice hockey forward who played 37 games in the National Hockey League (NHL) with the Boston Bruins and Washington Capitals between 2003 and 2006. The rest of his career, which lasted from 1998 to 2006, was spent in the minor leagues.

Career statistics

Regular season and playoffs

External links

1974 births
Living people
Belleville Bulls players
Boston Bruins players
Canadian expatriate ice hockey players in England
Canadian ice hockey forwards
Detroit Vipers players
Hershey Bears players
Ice hockey people from Nova Scotia
Kalamazoo Wings (1974–2000) players
Manchester Storm (1995–2002) players
Manitoba Moose (IHL) players
People from Glace Bay
Providence Bruins players
Saint John Flames players
St. John's Maple Leafs players
San Antonio Rampage players
Sportspeople from the Cape Breton Regional Municipality
Undrafted National Hockey League players
Utah Grizzlies (AHL) players
Washington Capitals players